Chelsea Kathryn Poppens (born February 19, 1991) is a professional basketball player who formerly played for the San Antonio Stars of the WNBA. She played college basketball at Iowa State University.

College
Poppens is one of two players to achieve more than 1,000 points and 1,000 rebounds in Iowa State women's basketball.

Iowa State statistics

Source

WNBA 
Poppens was selected 18th by the Seattle Storm, but she was waived. She then went to the San Antonio Silver Stars.

See also
Iowa State Cyclones women's basketball

References

External links
Iowa State bio
Poppens in the news in Ames Tribune

1991 births
Living people
American women's basketball players
American expatriate basketball people in Australia
American expatriate basketball people in Poland
Basketball players from Iowa
Iowa State Cyclones women's basketball players
Melbourne Boomers players
San Antonio Stars players
Seattle Storm draft picks
Forwards (basketball)